Maraveneh or Marauneh may refer to:
 Maraveneh 1
 Maraveneh 2
 Maraveneh 3
 Maraveneh 4